Malcolm Comrie (28 June 1906 – 1992) was a Scottish professional footballer who played in the Football League for York City, Manchester City, Burnley and Crystal Palace as an inside forward. He was capped by Scotland at junior level.

Personal life 
Comrie's uncle James and relative John were also footballers.

Career statistics

References

External links
Malcolm Comrie at holmesdale.net

1906 births
1992 deaths
People from Denny, Falkirk
Scottish footballers
Association football inside forwards
Brentford F.C. players
Manchester City F.C. players
Burnley F.C. players
Crystal Palace F.C. players
York City F.C. players
Bradford City A.F.C. players
English Football League players
Footballers from Falkirk (council area)
Dunipace F.C. players
Denny Hibernian F.C. players
Scottish Junior Football Association players
Scotland junior international footballers
Comrie family